An earthquake occurred at  on 8 October in Azad Kashmir . It was centred near the city of Muzaffarabad, and also affected nearby Balakot in Khyber Pakhtunkhwa and some areas of Jammu and Kashmir. It registered a moment magnitude of 7.6 and had a maximum Mercalli intensity of XI (Extreme). The earthquake was also felt in Afghanistan, Tajikistan, India, and the Xinjiang region. The severity of the damage caused by the earthquake is attributed to severe upthrust. Over 86,000 people died, a similar number were injured, and millions were displaced. It is considered the deadliest earthquake in South Asia, surpassing the 1935 Quetta earthquake.

Earthquake

Kashmir lies in the area of collision of the Eurasian and Indian tectonic plates. The geological activity born out of this collision, also responsible for the birth of the Himalayan mountain range, is the cause of unstable seismicity in the region.

Intensity

The earthquake had a maximum Modified Mercalli intensity of XI (Extreme) evaluated in an area around the epicentre, between the towns of Muzaffarabad and Balakot. It was also assigned XI on the Environmental Seismic Intensity scale. Field surveys of heavy damage to buildings and other structures in Balakot determined that the Modified Mercalli intensity exceeded X. At Muzaffarabad, the intensity peaked at VIII–IX (Severe–Violent). Intensity VII–VIII (Very strong–Severe) was determined in the areas south of Muzaffarabad.

The maximum intensity in India was VIII (Destructive) on the Medvedev–Sponheuer–Karnik scale (MSK), and was felt at Uri. MSK VII was felt in Kupwara and Baramulla. In Srinagar, the earthquake was felt with an MSK intensity of V. At areas where the seismic intensity was lower, collapses were documented.

Aftershocks
There were many secondary earthquakes in the region, mainly to the northwest of the original epicentre. A series of strong aftershocks occurred near Muzaffarabad. As of 27 October 2005 there had been more than 978 aftershocks with a magnitude of 4.0 and above that continued to occur daily. Since then, measurements from satellites have shown that mountain parts directly above the epicenter have risen by a few meters, giving ample proof that the Himalayas are still being formed and growing, and that this earthquake was a consequence of that.

Damage and casualties

Pakistan

Most of the devastation hit northern Pakistan and Pakistan administered Kashmir. In Kashmir, the three main districts were badly affected and Muzaffarabad, the state capital of Pakistan-administered Kashmir, was hardest hit in terms of casualties and destruction. Hospitals, schools, and rescue services including police and armed forces were paralysed. There was virtually no infrastructure and communication was badly affected. More than 70% of all casualties were estimated to have occurred in Muzaffarabad. Bagh, the second-most-affected district, accounted for 15% of the total casualties. In Islamabad, the Margalla Towers, an apartment complex in sector F-10, collapsed resulting in the deaths of an estimated 70 inhabitants. One Egyptian and two Japanese were among the dead there.

The Pakistani government's official death toll as of November 2005 stood at 87,350 although it is estimated that the death toll could have reached over 100,000. Approximately 138,000 were injured and over 3.5 million rendered homeless. According to government figures, 19,000 children died in the earthquake, most of them in widespread collapses of school buildings. The earthquake affected more than 500,000 families. In addition, approximately 250,000 farm animals died due to the collapse of stone barns, and more than 500,000 large animals required immediate shelter from the harsh winter. About 200 soldiers were also killed in the epicentral area.

As Saturday is a normal school day in the region, most students were at schools when the earthquake struck. Many were buried under collapsed school buildings. In Mansehra District, Khyber Pakhtunkhwa, one collapsing school killed 350 students, while another school in the same district killed an additional fifty students. Many people were also trapped in their homes and because it was the month of Ramadan, most people were taking a nap after their pre-dawn meal and did not have time to escape. Reports indicate that entire towns and villages were completely wiped out in northern Pakistan, with other surrounding areas also suffering severe damage.

"...a second, massive wave of death will happen if we do not step up our efforts now", Kofi Annan said on 20 October with reference to the thousand remote villages in which people "are in need of medical attention, food, clean water and shelter and the 120,000 survivors that have not yet been reached."

According to Pakistan's Interior Minister Aftab Ahmad Sherpao, Prime Minister Shaukat Aziz "made the appeal to survivors" on 26 October to come down to valleys and cities for relief, because bad weather, mountainous terrain, landslides and blocked roads are making it difficult for relief workers to reach each house and the winter snows are imminent."

India
At least 1,350 people were killed and 6,266 injured in Jammu and Kashmir in Indian administered Kashmir. In Uri there were over 150 deaths. The tremors were reportedly felt as far away as Delhi and Punjab.

Afghanistan
Four deaths were reported in Afghanistan, including a young girl who died in Jalalabad, after a wall collapsed on her. The quake was felt in Kabul, but the effects were minimal there.

Response

The national and international humanitarian response to the crisis was extensive. In the initial phases of response, the Pakistan Medical corps, Corps of Engineers, Army aviation and a large number of infantry units played important roles. Lt. Gen Afzal, Maj. Gen. Imtiaz, and Maj. Gen Javid were the leaders of their formations. Maj. Gen Farrukh Seir was in charge of foreign relief co-ordination. The relief work in Jammu and Kashmir was led by IAS officers of the state administration, Bashir Runyal and Jaipal Singh Law. In early 2006, the Government of Pakistan organized a donors' conference to raise money for reconstruction and development of the area. A total of $6.2 billion was pledged and a large amount of the money was delivered in terms of services of international NGOs with high pay scales. The rest of the money pledged, which was given to the Government of Pakistan for reconstruction and development, was used by a reconstruction authority called Earthquake Reconstruction and Rehabilitation Authority. 

Well over US$5.4 billion (400 billion Pakistani rupees) in aid arrived from all around the world. US Marine and Army helicopters stationed in neighbouring Afghanistan quickly flew aid into the devastated region along with five CH-47 Chinook helicopters from the Royal Air Force that were deployed from the United Kingdom. Five crossing points were opened on the Line of Control (LOC), between India and Pakistan, to facilitate the flow of humanitarian and medical aid to the affected region, and aid teams from different parts of Pakistan and around the world came to the region to assist in relief efforts.

See also

 Meena - "Life Smiled Again"
 Disaster Management Act, 2005
 October 2015 Hindu Kush earthquake
 2019 Kashmir earthquake
 List of earthquakes in 2005
 List of earthquakes in Pakistan
 List of earthquakes in India
 List of earthquakes in Afghanistan

References

Further reading

External links 

Television series 'Earthquake Diaries' on the rescue efforts
The Earthquake and the U.S. Response – Institute for Policy Studies
When The Earth Moved Kashmir – NASA Earth Observatory
The Kashmir Earthquake of October 8, 2005: Impacts in Pakistan  – Earthquake Engineering Research Institute
The Earthquake of 8 October 2005 in northern Pakistan – George Pararas-Carayannis
Remembering Oct 8, 2005: The day the earth shook – DAWN

2005 disasters in Asia  
2005 disasters in India 
2005 disasters in Pakistan 
 
2005 earthquakes
21st century in Azad Kashmir
Earthquakes in Afghanistan
Earthquakes in Pakistan
Disasters in Azad Kashmir
October 2005 events in Asia
October 2005 events in Pakistan